Mariya Mitsova (born 21 November 1996) is a Bulgarian badminton player. Mitsova represented her country at the 2014 Summer Youth Olympics in Nanjing, China. In 2016, she became the runner-up at the Croatian International tournament in the mixed doubles event partnered with Alex Vlaar. She won two titles at the Hellas International tournament in the women's singles and doubles event. She was part of the national team that won the silver medal at the 2016 European Women's Team Championships in Kazan, Russia.

Achievements

BWF International Challenge/Series (12 titles, 8 runners-up) 
Women's singles

Women's doubles

Mixed doubles

  BWF International Challenge tournament
  BWF International Series tournament
  BWF Future Series tournament

References

External links 
 

1996 births
Living people
Sportspeople from Ruse, Bulgaria
Bulgarian female badminton players
Badminton players at the 2014 Summer Youth Olympics
Badminton players at the 2019 European Games
European Games competitors for Bulgaria